Turje (Macedonian: Турје) may refer to:
Ganochora, a village in Pieria, Greece, formerly called Turje
Turje, Macedonia, a village in the Municipality of Debarca, Macedonia
Turje, Hrastnik, a village in the Municipality of Hrastnik, Slovenia
Türje, a village in Hungary